Ion Nițu (born 31 July 1952 – unknown) was a Romanian footballer who played as a defender for teams such as Steaua București, Jiul Petroșani and Bihor Oradea, among others.

Honours
Jiul Petroșani
Cupa României: 1973–74
Steaua București
Divizia A: 1973–74
Cupa României: 1978–79
Bihor Oradea
Divizia B: 1981–82

References

1952 births
Date of death missing
Romanian footballers
Association football defenders
Liga I players
Liga II players
FC Steaua București players
CSM Jiul Petroșani players
FC Bihor Oradea players
Footballers from Bucharest